Stewart John Walters (born 25 June 1983 in Mornington, Victoria) is an Australian cricketer. He is a right-handed batsman and a right-arm leg break bowler.

Cricket career

Early career
Walters played his early cricket for Midland-Guildford in the Western Australian Grade Cricket competition. He played under-age and second XI cricket for Western Australia before concentrating on county cricket in England.  He also played seven games of Australian rules football for Swan Districts in the West Australian Football League.

Surrey
Walters played in the 2006 Twenty20 Cup competition for his team, Surrey, though he averaged just 7 runs through the competition. He also played three games in the 2006 County Championship, debuting with a sturdy innings of 41, comprising ten boundaries and one single, from third in the batting order.

Since the opening of the 2007 season, Walters has played several non-Championship matches for the Surrey team, including various Second XI fixtures.

He played in the County Championship game against Essex in July 2009, making his highest first-class score of 111*. Walters is a middle-order batsman and occasional bowler. When Mark Butcher had to miss games because of his knee injury, and then announced his retirement with immediate effect in August 2009, Walters took over the captaincy on a short-term basis.

Glamorgan

In February 2011, Walters left Surrey to seek pastures new and joined Glamorgan signing a two-year contract. He signed a one-year extension to his contract in September 2012 after scoring Glamorgan's highest individual score of the 2012 season in the County Championship with 159 against Essex at Colchester and was their leading fielder with 13 catches. He was not re-engaged following the 2014 season.

Career best performances
as of 11 November 2014

External links 
 Cricket Archive profile
 Walters discussing impact of floodlights

References

1983 births
Living people
Cricketers from Melbourne
Australian expatriate cricketers in the United Kingdom
Australian cricketers
Glamorgan cricketers
Surrey cricketers
People educated at Guildford Grammar School
Australian cricket coaches
Australian rules footballers from Western Australia
Swan Districts Football Club players
Australian expatriate sportspeople in England
People from Mornington, Victoria